Michael James Brittain (June 21, 1963 – October 17, 1995) was an American professional basketball player.

In his senior year at Clearwater High School, the 7-foot center led the Jack Wilson-coached Clearwater High Tornadoes to a 32–3 record and the 1981 Class 4A State title.  Brittain scored 32 points in the State Championship game, winning easily over Miami Central 79–53.

Brittain went on to play collegiately for the University of South Carolina.

He was selected by the National Basketball Association's San Antonio Spurs in the second round (29th pick overall) of the 1985 NBA Draft and played for the Spurs for 38 games between 1985 and 1987.  He also played a season in the Continental Basketball Association (CBA) for the Pensacola Tornados, averaging 1.9 points and 2.3 rebounds in 15 games.

On October 21, 1995, Brittain was found dead in his Atlanta, Georgia, apartment. The DeKalb County Medical Examiner's Office attributed his death to high blood-alcohol concentration, based on toxicology tests performed by the Georgia Bureau of Investigation. At the time of his death, he was working as a regional manager for a pharmaceutical company there.

References

External links
 

1963 births
1995 deaths
American men's basketball players
Basketball players from Florida
Centers (basketball)
Clearwater High School alumni
Pensacola Tornados (1986–1991) players
San Antonio Spurs draft picks
San Antonio Spurs players
South Carolina Gamecocks men's basketball players
Sportspeople from Clearwater, Florida
Alcohol-related deaths in Georgia (U.S. state)